Sweets for the Sweet Taste of Love is an album by jazz trumpeter Harry "Sweets" Edison with recorded in California in 1964 and released by the Vee-Jay label.

Track listing 
 "Dream" (Johnny Mercer) – 3:10
 "Isn't It Romantic?" (Richard Rodgers, Lorenz Hart) – 2:31
 "When Your Lover Has Gone" (Einar Aaron Swan) – 3:17
 "Nice 'n' Easy"  (Alan Bergman, Marilyn Keith, Lew Spence) – 2:38
 "My Old Flame" (Arthur Johnston, Sam Coslow) – 3:21
 "Don't Know What Kind of Blues I've Got" (Duke Ellington) – 3:04
 "I'm Lost" (Otis René) – 4:16
 "The Girl from Ipanema" (Antônio Carlos Jobim, Vinicius de Moraes, Norman Gimbel) – 3:06
 "You're Blasé" (Ord Hamilton, Bruce Sievier) – 2:59	
 "Blues in My Heart" (Benny Carter, Irving Mills) – 3:41
 "I Hadn't Anyone Till You" (Ray Noble) – 2:48
 "Honeysuckle Rose" (Fats Waller, Andy Razaf) – 3:21

Personnel 
Harry "Sweets" Edison – trumpet
Orchestra conducted by Benny Carter featuring:
Gerald Wiggins – piano
John Collins – guitar
Joe Comfort – bass
Earl Palmer – drums
Additional unidentified musicians – trombones, violins, harp and vocal group
Benny Carter (tracks 6–8), Dick Hazard (tracks 1, 2, 4, 9–10 && 12), Warren Baker (tracks 3, 5 & 11) – arrangement

References 

Harry Edison albums
1964 albums
Vee-Jay Records albums
Albums arranged by Benny Carter
Albums arranged by Richard Hazard